Hugh le Despenser (1 March 126127 October 1326), sometimes referred to as "the Elder Despenser", was for a time the chief adviser to King Edward II of England. He was created a baron in 1295 and Earl of Winchester in 1322. One day after being captured by forces loyal to Sir Roger Mortimer and Edward’s wife, Queen Isabella, who were leading a rebellion against Edward, he was hanged and then beheaded.

Ancestry
Despenser was the son of Hugh le Despencer (1223–1265, briefly Justiciar of England) and Aline Basset, only daughter and heiress of Philip Basset. His father was killed at the Battle of Evesham when Hugh was a boy, but Hugh's patrimony was saved through the influence of his maternal grandfather, who had been loyal to the king.

Life

Despenser served Edward I on numerous occasions both in battle and as a diplomat, and was created a baron by writ of summons to Parliament in 1295. His son, Hugh Despenser the Younger, became a favourite of Edward II, in what was rumoured to be a homosexual relationship. Hugh the Elder was loyal to his son and the King, which worried the barons. Until that time, the highest office he had held was justice of the forests.

He was one of the few barons to remain loyal to Edward during the controversy regarding Piers Gaveston. Despenser became Edward's loyal servant and chief administrator after Gaveston was executed in 1312, but the jealousy of other barons—and, more importantly, his own corruption and unjust behaviour—led to his being exiled along with his son in 1321, when Edmund of Woodstock, Earl of Kent replaced him as Lord Warden of the Cinque Ports.

Edward found it difficult to manage without them, and recalled them to England a year later, an action which enraged Queen Isabella, the more so when Despenser was created Earl of Winchester in 1322. Although his reputation was not as unsavoury as his son's, Despenser the Elder was accused by a significant number of people of widespread criminality during the next few years, often involving false accusations of trespass or theft and the extortion of money or land.

Death
When Isabella, Queen of England, and Sir Roger Mortimer led a rebellion against her husband Edward, they captured both Despensers—first the elder, later the younger. Following Hugh the Elder's capture at the Siege of Bristol, Isabella interceded for him, but his enemies, notably Mortimer and Henry, Earl of Lancaster, insisted that both father and son should face trial and execution.

One day after being captured, the elder Despenser was hanged in his armour at Bristol on 27 October 1326. He was then beheaded, after which his body was cut into pieces and fed to dogs. His head was sent to be displayed in Winchester, which had supported the king. Despenser's Winchester title was forfeit, not to be revived until 1472. The younger Despenser was hanged, drawn and quartered at Hereford the following month.

After Despenser's death, pardons were issued to thousands of people whom he had falsely accused.

Marriage and issue
He married Isabel de Beauchamp, a daughter of William de Beauchamp, 9th Earl of Warwick (c.1238–1298) by his wife Maud FitzJohn, and widow of Sir Patrick de Chaurces. By his wife he had two sons and several daughters, including: 
Hugh Despenser the Younger;
Philip le Despenser (grandfather of Philip le Despenser, 1st Baron le Despenser);
Isabel le Despenser, second wife of John Hastings, 1st Baron Hastings and second wife of Ralph de Monthermer, 1st Baron Monthermer;
Margaret le Despenser, wife of John de St Amand, 1st Baron Amand (1283/6–1330).

Notes

References
Ancestral Roots of Certain American Colonists Who Came to America Before 1700 by Frederick Lewis Weis, Lines: 72–31, 74–31, 74A-31, 93A-29
 
 Karau, Björn: Günstlinge am Hof Edwards II. von England – Aufstieg und Fall der Despensers, MA-Thesis, Kiel 1999. (Free Download: http://www.despensers.de/download.htm)
 
 

1261 births
1326 deaths
13th-century English nobility
14th-century English nobility
14th-century crime
Earls of Winchester
Lords Warden of the Cinque Ports
Executed English people
People convicted under a bill of attainder
People executed under the Plantagenets for treason against England
People executed by the Kingdom of England by hanging
14th-century executions by England
Hugh
Medieval English criminals
Barons le Despencer